Christianity is the largest religion in Central African Republic, practiced by 75-89 percent of the population. According to a 2019 study Protestants outnumber Catholics in the Central African Republic. Accordingly, 61% of the population is Protestant and 28% is Catholic. Some Christians are influenced by animist beliefs and practices.  

Islam is the second largest religion in the country, practiced by 9-15 percent of the population. The vast majority of Muslims are Malikite Sunni. It is believed that many of these followers incorporate traditional indigenous elements into their faith practices. In 2021, there were around 703,373 refugees from the Central African Republic in bordering countries, with most of them adhering to Islam.

See also
Roman Catholicism in the Central African Republic
Demographics of the Central African Republic
Central African Republic conflict – A sectarian civil conflict
Islam in the Central African Republic

References